C+ or C Plus may refer to:

C Plus, a brand name of the soft drink Sunkist in some places
HolyC (programming language), TempleOS programming language formerly known as C+
C+ (grade), an academic grade
C++, a programming language
C with Classes, predecessor to the C++ programming language
ANSI C, a programming language (as opposed to K&R C)
ABCL/c+, a programming language
Faster-than-light travel, above the speed of light, c

See also

 C (disambiguation)
 CX (disambiguation)
 CXX (disambiguation)
 CC (disambiguation)